Joslin Mbatjiua Kamatuka (born 27 July 1991) is a Namibian football player. He plays in South Africa for Baroka F.C.

International
He made his Namibia national football team debut on 19 May 2015 in a 2015 COSAFA Cup game against Mauritius.

He was selected for the 2019 Africa Cup of Nations squad and scored his country's only goal in the tournament, in the last group game against the Ivory Coast on 1 July 2019.

International goals
Scores and results list Namibia's goal tally first.

References

External links
 
 

1991 births
Footballers from Windhoek
Living people
Namibia international footballers
Association football midfielders
SK Windhoek players
African Stars F.C. players
United Africa Tigers players
Namibia Premier League players
National First Division players
Namibian expatriate footballers
Expatriate soccer players in South Africa
2019 Africa Cup of Nations players
Namibian expatriate sportspeople in South Africa
Namibian men's footballers